Gallo Gallina (1778–1837) was an Italian painter and engraver, working in a Neoclassical style. He was active also as a lithographer.

He helped Giulio Ferrario complete the volumes of Costumi antichi e Moderni. He became the custodian of the archaeological museum in the Brera Academy. He painted a canvas for the baptistery of Cremona Cathedral.

References

Further reading
La pittura neoclassica di Gallo Gallina: artista cremonese del 19. secolo. Banca popolare di Cremona, 1997.

1796 births
1874 deaths
18th-century Italian painters
Italian male painters
19th-century Italian painters
19th-century Italian male artists
Italian engravers
Painters from Milan
Italian neoclassical painters
18th-century Italian male artists